Yengi Kand (also Romanized as Yengī Kand) is a village in Ajorluy-ye Sharqi Rural District, Baruq District, Miandoab County, West Azerbaijan Province, Iran. At the 2006 census, its population was 248, in 46 families.

References 

Populated places in Miandoab County